Irina Korschunow (31 December 1925 – 31 December 2013) was a German writer. Her oeuvre comprises short stories, novels theatrical works and film scripts. Born in Stendal, she started her career as a journalist and writer for children's books and young adult literature but focused predominantly on writing novels in her later years since about 1983. She was also a translator.

Career 
She studied German, Drama, Social Sciences, and English. In the 1950s she became a journalist and author. She lived in Munich.

Awards 
1977 Toucan Prize
1985 Silberner Griffel 
1987 Roswitha Prize
2004 Hertha Koenig-Prize For Literature

Bibliography (German titles)

Children's literature 

 Die Wawuschels mit den grünen Haaren (1967)
 Neues von den Wawuschels mit den grünen Haaren (1969)
 Wenn ein Unugunu kommt (1976)
 Eigentlich war es ein schöner Tag. Tinas aufregende Erlebnisse (1977)
 Hanno malt sich einen Drachen (1978)
 Tim und Großvaters Pferd (1979)
 Deshalb heiße ich Starker Bär (1981), als Ravensburger Taschenbuch: Mit Illustrationen von Hansjörg Langenfass, Otto Maier Verlag, Ravensburg, 1983, .
 Der Findefuchs (1982)
 Fränzchen Dudel sucht einen Schatz, mit Zeichnungen von Sandy Nightingale. Parabel Verlag, Schwäbisch Hall 1985, 
 Jaga und der Kleine Mann mit der Flöte  (1983)
 Kleiner Pelz (1984)
 Töktök und der blaue Riese (Neuauflage 1985)
 Kleiner Pelz will größer werden (1986)
 Wuschelbär (1990)
 Der bunte Hund, das schwarze Schaf und der Angsthase (1992)
 Steffis roter Luftballon (1994)
 Benni und die Mumpshexe mit Bildern von Regina Kehn. Arena Verlag, 1994. .
 Der kleine Clown Pippo (Neuauflage 1996)
 Es muss auch kleine Riesen geben (1997)
 Niki aus dem 10. Stock (Originalausgabe erschien 1973, Neuauflage 1997)

Young adult fiction 

 Die Sache mit Christoph (1978)
 Er hieß Jan (1979)
 Ein Anruf von Sebastian (1981)

Novels 

 Glück hat seinen Preis, Roman. Hoffmann und Campe Verlag (1983)
 Der Eulenruf, Hoffmann und Campe Verlag (1985)
 Malenka, Hoffmann und Campe Verlag (1987)
 Fallschirmseide, Hoffmann und Campe Verlag (1990)
 Das Spiegelbild, Hoffmann und Campe Verlag (1992)
 Ebbe und Flut, Hoffmann und Campe Verlag (1995)
 Von Juni zu Juni, Hoffmann und Campe Verlag (1999)
 Das Luftkind, Hoffmann und Campe Verlag (2003)
 Langsamer Abschied, Hoffmann und Campe Verlag (2009)

Film scripts 

 Der Führerschein (TV, 1978)
 Der Urlaub (TV, 1980)
 Wie es geschah (TV, 1983)
 Der Hochzeitstag (TV, 1985)
 Michas Flucht (TV, 1988)

References 

1925 births
2013 deaths
German children's writers
Officers Crosses of the Order of Merit of the Federal Republic of Germany
People from Stendal
German women novelists
German women children's writers
German screenwriters
German women screenwriters
German people of Russian descent
20th-century German novelists
20th-century German women writers
Film people from Saxony-Anhalt